Lonaconing Furnace, also known as The George's Creek Coal and Iron Company Furnace No. 1, is a historic iron furnace in Lonaconing, Allegany County, Maryland, United States. It first produced iron in 1839, then the iron operation was abandoned in the mid-1850s, the Loncaconing Furnace complex included a top house, molding house, engine house, and two hot-air furnaces for heating the blast. None of these ancillary structures remains. It played a significant role in demonstrating that both coke and raw bituminous coal could be used as fuels in the manufacture of iron. It is known as "the first coke furnace, whose operation was successful, erected in this country."

Lonaconing Furnace was listed on the National Register of Historic Places in 1973.

References

External links
, including photo in 1979, at Maryland Historical Trust

Buildings and structures in Allegany County, Maryland
Industrial buildings and structures on the National Register of Historic Places in Maryland
Industrial buildings completed in 1836
National Register of Historic Places in Allegany County, Maryland